Duss may refer to:
 Duss, Gotland, a populated place in Sweden
 Ad Duss, a village in Oman
 Antoine Duss (1840–1924), Swiss botanist
 Vera Duss (1910–2005), American–French doctor and Roman Catholic nun

See also 
 Dus (disambiguation)